Women's Rights National Historical Park was established in 1980, and covers a total of  of land in Seneca Falls and nearby Waterloo, New York, United States.

The park consists of four major historical properties including the Wesleyan Methodist Church, which was the site of the 1848 Seneca Falls Convention, the first women's rights convention. The Elizabeth Cady Stanton House, and the homes of other early women's rights activists (the M'Clintock House and the Richard Hunt House) are also on display. The park includes a visitor center and an education and cultural center housing the Suffrage Press Printshop.

The Visitor Center lobby houses a large, life-size bronze sculpture, The First Wave, which consists of twenty figures representing women and men who attended the first Women's Rights Convention. Nine of the sculpture's figures represent actual participants and organizers of the convention: Elizabeth Cady Stanton, Lucretia Mott, Mary Ann M'Clintock, Martha Wright, Jane Hunt, Frederick Douglass, James Mott, Thomas M'Clintock, and Richard Hunt.  The other eleven figures represent the "anonymous" women and men who participated in the two-day convention, which took place on July 19 and 20, 1848, and which drew over 300 people. Many of the participants signed the Declaration of Sentiments, the convention's defining document, which declared that "all men and women are created equal."

Establishing legislation 
View the Federal enabling legislation, Public Law 96-607 Title XVI on Congress.gov, that created Women's Rights National Historical Park on December 28, 1980. 

https://www.congress.gov/bill/96th-congress/senate-bill/2363

Administrative History

Superintendents of Women's Rights National Historical Park 
Ahna Wilson – 2021 to current  

Andrea (Andie) DeKoter – 2019 

Noemi "Ami" Ghazala – 2013 - 2019 

Tammy Duchesne- 2011 - 2013 

Tina Orcutt’s - 2004-2011 

Josie Fernandez -1998-2004 

Joanne Hanley - 1994-1997  

Linda Canzanelli - 1989-1994 

Judy Hart - 1982-1989

Region 
Region: Northeast (Consistent)

Problems facing the park today 
According to the National Park Service, the Women's Rights National Historical Park has a backlog of $5.3 million in maintenance and repairs as of fiscal year 2018. That backlog is mostly at the visitors center but also is at some of the historic homes at the park, including the Elizabeth Cady Stanton House, the Hunt House, and the M'Clintock House in Waterloo.  That's an increase from the $4.6 million maintenance estimate listed in fiscal year 2017.

Votes For Women History Trail 
The Votes For Women History Trail, created as part of the federal Omnibus Public Land Management Act of 2009, is administered by the Department of the Interior through the Women's Rights National Historical Park.  The Trail is an automobile route that links sites throughout upstate New York important to the establishment of women's suffrage.

Sites on the trail include:
 Susan B. Anthony House in Rochester
 Mount Hope Cemetery in Rochester
 Antoinette Louisa Brown Blackwell Childhood Home in Henrietta
 M'Clintock House in Waterloo
 The Women's Rights National Historical Park itself

See also
List of monuments and memorials to women's suffrage
Timeline of women's suffrage
Timeline of women's suffrage in the United States
Women's suffrage
Women's suffrage in the United States

References

External links

 
 The M'Clintock House: A Home to the Women's Rights Movement, a National Park Service Teaching with Historic Places (TwHP) lesson plan
 "Writings of Elizabeth Cady Stanton", broadcast from Women's Rights National Historical Park from C-SPAN's American Writers

 
History museums in New York (state)
National Historical Parks of the United States
Museums in Seneca County, New York
Women's museums in New York (state)
Parks on the National Register of Historic Places in New York (state)
Protected areas established in 1980
National Park Service areas in New York (state)
Parks in Seneca County, New York
Women's suffrage in the United States
1980 establishments in New York (state)
Monuments and memorials to women
National Register of Historic Places in Seneca County, New York
Seneca Falls, New York
Monuments and memorials to women's suffrage in the United States